A fraternity or fraternal organization is an organized society of men associated together in an environment of companionship and brotherhood; dedicated to the intellectual, physical, and social development of its members. Service clubs, lineage societies, and secret societies are among the fraternal organizations listed here. College fraternities and sororities appear in the List of social fraternities and sororities.

International
These are fraternal organizations that operate internationally.

Fraternal orders
Order of Free Gardeners

Druids
 Ancient Order of Druids
 United Ancient Order of Druids
 Order of Druids

E Clampus Vitus
 E Clampus Vitus

Foresters
 Fraternal Forestry
 Independent Order of Foresters
 Foresters Friendly Society
 Ancient Order of United Workmen

Freemasonry
 Freemasonry
 DeMolay International
International Order of the Rainbow for Girls
 Order of the Eastern Star
 Scottish Rite
 Shriners
 York Rite
 Job's Daughters International

Odd Fellows
 Odd Fellows
 Independent Order of Odd Fellows (IOOF)
 Ancient Mystic Order of Samaritans (AMOS)
 Daughters of Rebekah
 Ladies of the Orient (LOTO)
 Independent Order of Oddfellows Manchester Unity
 Grand United Order of Oddfellows (GUOOFS)

Other fraternal orders
 Ancient Mystical Order Rosae Crucis
 Ancient Order of Hibernians
 Beta Sigma Phi, ΒΣΦ, 1931, non-collegiate sorority
 Fraternal Order of Eagles of US and Canada (Fraternal Order of Eagles in the Philippines is not an affiliate or under its jurisdiction) 
 Improved Order of Red Men
 International Order of Twelve Knights and Daughters of Tabor
 Native Sons of the Golden West
 Orange Order
 Ordo Templi Orientis
 Reformed Ogboni Fraternity (Nigeria)
 Royal Antediluvian Order of Buffaloes
 Vasa Order of America

Fraternal service organisations
 B'nai Brith
 Brotherhood of St. Andrew
 Civitan
 Concatenated Order of Hoo-Hoo
 Dramatic Order of the Knights of Khorassan
 Epsilon Sigma Alpha International
 Gyro International
 Illuminati
 Imperial Court System
 International Organisation of Good Templars (or IOGT - EST. 1776)
 Junior Chamber International (Jaycees or Junior Chamber of Commerce)
 Kiwanis International
 Knights of Columbus
 Columbian Squires
 International Order of Alhambra
 Knights of Pythias
 Lions Clubs International
 Moose International
 Optimist International
 Rosicrucian Fellowship
 Rotary International
 Round Table Club
 Ruritan
 Samaritans (charity)
 Sertoma International
 Sons of Norway
 Soroptimist
 Woodmen of the World
 Zonta International

Australia
Fraternities or lodges were an important part of Australian society in the 19th and the first half of the 20th century. After the Second World War, they were gradually replaced by "service clubs", such as Lions, Apex and Rotary. By the end of the 20th century, most fraternities had been wound up except for the Freemasons and a few lodges of the Buffaloes. Many fraternities also offered insurance to their members and as membership declined, these operations were either combined with other non profit insurance companies or sold with the proceeds being distributed to charitable causes.

The reasons for their decline probably have something to do with their male only membership, generational change and bemusement at secretive rites and rituals. All fraternities had different rules and rites, but they all appear to have been complex. The service clubs that succeeded the fraternities also operated as social networks and did fairly similar charitable work. No general history has been written, but some of the many lodges that operated in the state of Victoria were:

 Ancient Order of Hibernians for Irish Catholics
 Ancient Order of Druids
 Foresters Friendly Society
 Freemasons, including United Grand Lodge of New South Wales and the Australian Capital Territory
 Knights of the Southern Cross 
 Loyal Orange Lodge 
 Odd Fellows (Independent Order of Odd Fellows or IOOF)
 Rechabites
 Royal Antediluvian Order of Buffaloes

Canada
 Ancient Order of Hibernians
 Canadian Fraternal Association
 Canadian Order for Home Circles
 Independent Order of Odd Fellows
 International Order of Alhambra
 Kin Canada
 Knights of Columbus
 Knights of Pythias
 Orange Order
 P.E.O. Sisterhood
 Royal Antediluvian Order of Buffaloes
 Zeta Psi

Europe

Denmark
 Independent Order of Odd Fellows

Republic of Ireland
 Ancient Order of Hibernians
 Clan na Gael
 Irish National Foresters
 Knights of Saint Columbanus
 Orange Order

Sweden
Independent Order of Odd Fellows
Swedish Order of Freemasons
Samfundet SHT

United Kingdom

 Ancient Order of Druids
 Ancient Order of Hibernians
 Apprentice Boys of Derry
 Grand United Order of Oddfellows Friendly Society
 Gorseth
 Gorsedd Cymru
 Gorsedh Kernow
 Grand Order of Water Rats
 Independent Order of Oddfellows Manchester Unity Friendly Society
 Knights of St Columba
 Lions International
 Orange Order
 Royal Arch Purple
 Royal Black Institution
 Order of Druids
 Royal Antediluvian Order of Buffaloes
 Rotary International
 United Ancient Order of Druids

South Africa
 Afrikaner Broederbond
Freemasonry in South Africa

United States
 Afro-American Sons and Daughters
 Aid Association of Lutherans
 American Hellenic Educational Progressive Association
 American Legion
 Ancient Order of Hibernians
 Benevolent and Protective Order of Elks (BPOE)
Danish Brotherhood in America
 E Clampus Vitus
 Fraternal Order of Eagles
 Fraternal Order of Moai
 Fraternal Order of Owls
 Fraternal Order Orioles 
 Freemasonry
 Honorable Order of the Blue Goose, International
 Improved Order of Heptasophs
 Improved Order of Red Men
 Independent Order of Odd Fellows (or IOOF aka Odd Fellows)
 Grand United Order of Oddfellows Friendly Society
 International Order of Alhambra
 International Organization of Good Templars (or IOGT - EST. 1776)
 Junior Order of United American Mechanics
 United States Junior Chamber (JAYCEES)
 Knights of Columbus
 Knights of Peter Claver
 Knights of Pythias
 Knights of the Golden Eagle
 Knights of the Maccabees
 MEANA (Malayalee Engineers Association in North America)
 National Haymakers Association 
 Native Sons of the Golden West 
Omicron Epsilon Pi, ΟΕΠ, 2000, non-collegiac lesbians and lesbians of color
Orange Order 
 Order of Heptasophs
 Order of Scottish Clans
 Order of the Arrow (BSA)
 Order Sons of Italy in America
 Patriotic Order Sons of America
 P.E.O. Sisterhood
 Rascals, Rogues, and Rapscallions
 Sons of Confederate Veterans
 Sons of Hermann
 Sons of Norway
 Sons of Union Veterans of the Civil War
 Sons of the American Revolution
 Sons of the Revolution
 The National Grange of the Order of Patrons of Husbandry (The Grange)
 Unico National
 Vasa Order of America (or VOA - EST. 1896)
 Veterans of Foreign Wars (VFW)
 World War Veterans
 Woodmen of the World

See also
 Fraternal benefit society
 Fraternal order
 Fraternity
 List of fraternal auxiliaries and side degrees
 List of social fraternities and sororities
 List of Masonic Grand Lodges
 List of North American ethnic and religious fraternal orders
 List of North American fraternal benefit orders
 Secret society
 Service club
 Social club

References

External links
 Survey of Secret Societies and Museum of Fraternal Lithographs Survey of history and ritual covering diverse organizations including Freemasonry, and groups that have imitated Masonry such as the Odd Fellows, Knights of Pythias, Improved Order of Red Men, Knights of the Golden Eagle, Knights of the Maccabees, B'nai B'rith, Orange Order, Royal Black Preceptory, Hibernians, Greek Letter Fraternities, etc. and so-called magical fraternities such as the Ordo Templi Orientis and Aurum Solis.
 listing of secret society, fraternal organizations and fraternal orders with abbreviations, with slogans and mottoes

Fraternities